Old Burying Ground is a historic cemetery located at Beaufort, Carteret County, North Carolina. It was established in 1724. There are approximately 200 stones from the pre-American Civil War era, approximately 45 from the war period, about 150 from 1865 to 1900, and a few 20th-century markers.  Notable burials include  Otway Burns, a naval hero in the War of 1812, and Colonel William Thompson, commander of the Carteret County Regiment during the American Revolution.

It was listed on the National Register of Historic Places in 1974.

References

External links

 

Cemeteries on the National Register of Historic Places in North Carolina
1724 establishments in North Carolina
Buildings and structures in Carteret County, North Carolina
National Register of Historic Places in Carteret County, North Carolina